The discography of American singer Haliene consists of five lead singles, ten featured singles and twelve guest appearances. Her discography as Kelly Sweet consists of two studio albums, two extended plays (EPs), six lead singles, five featured singles and one song from a motion picture soundtrack. She has released songs on electronic music record labels such as Ultra Records and Armada Music. Her debut single "We Are One" as Kelly Sweet peaked on the Dance Club Songs chart at 25th. As Haliene, her collaborative singles "Twilight vs Breathe" and "Stars & Moon" have peaked at 7th on the Dance Airplay Chart and 26th on the Dance/Electronic Songs chart respectively.

Haliene

Studio albums

Singles

As lead artist

As featured artist

Guest appearances

Kelly Sweet

Studio albums

Extended plays

Singles

As lead artist

As featured artist

Soundtracks

References

External links 
Kelly Sweet discography on AllMusic
Haliene discography on AllMusic

Electronic music discographies
Discographies of American artists